The World Was His Jury is a 1958 American drama film directed by Fred F. Sears and starring Edmond O'Brien and Mona Freeman. It was released by Columbia Pictures.

Plot
A cruise ship's captain dies and Jerry Barrett is promoted to replace him. On the way to New York City, the vessel catches fire. Barrett is knocked unconscious by falling debris, first officer Martin Ranker tries to save the ship but 162 passengers die.

Barrett is prosecuted for criminal negligence. Attorney David Carson agrees to represent him, infuriating wife Robin, who resents Carson trying to free guilty clients and declares that she is leaving him. Ranker's testimony damages Barrett and another witness insinuates the interim captain was drunk. An armed man tries to shoot Barrett in the courthouse, and a crew member discredited by Carson on the stand is later found stabbed to death.

Carson discovers that certain crewmen falsified their documents and had criminal records. Ranker, a 40-year veteran, resented being passed over for the captaincy and hired men to commit arson, never meaning the blaze to get out of control. He confesses on the stand, Robin returns to Carson and the defendant goes free.

Cast
 Edmond O'Brien as David Carson
 Mona Freeman as Robin Carson
 Robert McQueeney as Barrett
 Paul Birch as Ranker
 John Beradino as Tony Arnaud
 Carlos Romero as 2nd Officer Johnson

References

External links

Review of film at Variety

1958 films
American drama films
Columbia Pictures films
1958 drama films
Films directed by Fred F. Sears
1950s English-language films
1950s American films